Segerstrom High School (English: [ˈsɛgərstrəm]) is a public high school in Santa Ana, California, and is part of the Santa Ana Unified School District (SAUSD). The school opened in fall of 2005. Wealthy landowner Henry Segerstrom - for whom Segerstrom High School is named - is a familiar name in Orange County. The land upon which Segerstrom High School is built was purchased from the Segerstrom family, who once grew crops on these acres.

Students
The class of 2008 was the first to graduate from Segerstrom.

Segerstrom graduates 43% of its students compared to other schools in the District which consistently graduate a much smaller percentage of their students. Further, over 39% of Segerstrom students either enroll in community college or go on to pursue a degree from a four-year institution.

There are currently 2,513 students attending Segerstrom.

Buildings
The school is divided into five buildings. Building A houses the main office, library, gym, and the English Department. Building B houses a 430-seat Performing Arts Center as well as the band, choir, and drama classrooms. Building C is labeled "Humanities" and houses the World Languages, Social Sciences, and partially the V.A.P.A. Departments respectively. Building D is the Science building and Building E homes the Mathematics Department.

Segerstrom also features a full-sized football stadium with an all-weather running track surrounding the field. It was the first football field to be constructed on any high school in the Santa Ana Unified School District's schools. Before its construction, that district maintained a contract with the City Santa Ana's Parks and Recreation department to use the citywide stadium (Eddie West Field). Segerstrom's stadium now serves to host many of the high school's weekly football games during the season.

English / Language Arts Department (A)

AP 
Junior -
 AP English Language and Composition

Senior -

 AP English Literature and Composition

English / Language Arts 
Freshman -

 E-Sports English 9
 English 9 CP
 Honors English 9
 English 9 Ethnic Studies
 Honors English 9 Ethnic Studies

Sophomore -

 E-Sports English 10
 English 10 CP
 Honors English 10

Junior -

 E-Sports English 11
 English 11 CP
 Honors English 11

Senior -

 E-Sports English 12
 English Film, Literature, and Comprehension
 English 12 Expository Reading & Writing Course

Visual & Performing Arts Departments (B & C)

AP 

 AP Studio Art
 AP Art History

VAPA 

 Drawing and Painting
 Chamber Singers
 Concert Choir
 Men's Choir
 Women's Choir
 Concert Women's Choir
 Intro to Drama
 Drama Production
 Concert Band
 Marching Band
 Orchestra
 Guitar
 Piano

Social Science Department (C)

AP 
Freshman -

 AP Human Geography

Sophomore -

 AP World History
 AP Psychology

Junior -

 AP United States History
 AP Psychology

Senior -

 AP United States Government and Politics / AP Macroeconomics
 AP United States Government and Politics / CP Economics
 AP Psychology

Social Sciences 
Sophomore -

 CP World History

Junior -

 CP United States History

Senior -

 CP Government / Economics

World Languages Department (C)

AP

Freshman - 

 AP Spanish Language and Culture
Sophomore -
 AP Spanish Language and Culture
 AP Spanish Literature and Culture
Junior -
 AP Spanish Language and Culture
 AP Spanish Literature and Culture
 AP French Language and Culture

Senior -
 AP Spanish Language and Culture
 AP Spanish Literature and Culture
 AP French Language and Culture

Languages

Spanish 
 Spanish 1
 Spanish 2
 Spanish 3
 Spanish 2 Advanced
 Spanish 3 Advanced
 Spanish Language and Culture A
 Spanish Language and Culture B

French 
 French 1
 French 2
 French 3

American Sign Language 
 ASL 1
 ASL 2
 ASL 3
 ASL 4

Science Department (D)

AP 

Junior Year -

 AP Biology
 AP Chemistry
 AP Physics 1
 AP Environmental Science

Senior Year -

 AP Biology
 AP Chemistry
 AP Physics 1
 AP Physics B
 AP Physics C
 AP Environmental Science

Sciences 
Freshman Year -

 CP Biology
 Honors Biology
 Environmental Science

Sophomore Year -

 CP Biology
 CP Chemistry
 Honors Chemistry

Junior Year -

 Human Anatomy
 Marine Biology
 Forensics
 CP Physics

Senior Year -

 Human Anatomy
 Marine Biology
 Forensics
 CP Physics

Mathematics Department (E)

AP 
Sophomore Year -

 AP Calculus AB

Junior Year -

 AP Calculus AB
 AP Calculus BC

Senior Year -

 AP Calculus AB
 AP Calculus BC
 AP Statistics

Mathematics 
Freshman Year -

 CP Algebra 1
 Honors Algebra 1
 CP Geometry
 Honors Geometry
 Honors Algebra 2

Sophomore Year -

 CP Algebra 1
 CP Geometry
 Honors Geometry
 CP Algebra 2
 Honors Algebra 2
 College Algebra
 Honors Math Analysis

Junior Year -

 CP Geometry
 CP Algebra 2
 Honors Algebra 2
 College Algebra 
 Honors Math Analysis

Senior Year -

 CP Algebra 2
 College Algebra
 Intro to Data Sciences
 Honors Math Analysis

Athletics
2009: The top-seeded Jaguars defeated Arroyo High School of El Monte, 10–8, capturing the CIF-SS Division Varsity Boys Tennis championship. This was Santa Ana's first Boys Tennis title from any high school, and the first high school in the city to play in the championship match since 1962.

2013: Boys Water Polo Jaguars defeat Yorba Linda Mustangs to capture CIF Title! The Jaguar Water Polo team finished an amazing season in grand style by defeating Yorba Linda 9–8 to claim the CIF Division 7 Championship.

2014: Segerstrom High School has officially partnered with USA Water Polo and the Santa Ana YMCA to be the home training site for the Men's National Water Polo team through Rio 2016. Proud day for Segerstrom High School. Go Team USA!

2014: Girls Water Polo - CIF Champions.
The Lady Jags defeated Ocean View 7–4 to capture Division 7 Crown.

2019: Girls Tennis - CIF Champions.
The Lady Jags defeated Western High School to claim the championship.

2023: Girls Tennis - CIF Championship
The Lady Jags defeated ? to claim the championship

Extracurricular
AVID 
ASB ( Associated Student Body)
Clubs: 
CSF (California Scholarship Federation)
FCA (Fellowship of Christian Athletes)
GSA (Gay-Straight Alliance)
KIWIN'S
Key Club
National Honor Society
Red Cross
L.U.L.A.C.
Journalism
Quiz Bowl
Make-A-Wish 
Girl's League 
French Club 
Mock Trial

Awards
Silver Medal Recipient from US News, ranking #610 Nationwide and #116 Statewide

Notes

United Spirit Association (USA) 2010 National Winners

OC VARSITY

OC VARSITY Tennis Page

References

External links
 
 Segerstrom High School Sport Page
 United Spirit Association Page

Educational institutions established in 2005
High schools in Santa Ana, California
Public high schools in California
2005 establishments in California